Mold-A-Rama is a brand name for a type of vending machine that makes injection molded plastic figurines.  Mold-A-Rama machines debuted in late 1962  and grew in prominence at the 1964 New York World's Fair. The machines can still be found operating in dozens of museums and zoos.

History
American inventor John H. "Tike" Miller is credited with conceiving a free-standing plastic-molding machine in the 1950s. He licensed his mold-making patent and related technology to the Automatic Retailers Of America (Aramark), which operated Mold-A-Rama machines as a subsidiary company through 1969. Aramark divested all machines and service locations by 1972 because of the high cost of the equipment. As of 2010, two US companies own and operate Mold-A-Rama machines: the William A. Jones Company in Illinois and Replication Devices in Florida. As of November 2015, there are 124 machines in a total of eight different states.

See also
 Plastic forming machine

References

External links
William A. Jones Company official website
Replication Devices official website
Mold-A-Rama Machines category on Waymarking.com 

Toy figurines
Vending machines
Products introduced in 1962